A playlist markup language is a markup language that specifies the contents and playback of a digital multimedia playlist; this includes streams of music, slideshows or even animations.

List of playlist markup languages
 .asx, an XML style playlist containing more information about the items on the playlist.
 .smil is an XML recommendation of the World Wide Web Consortium that includes playlist features.
 Kalliope PlayList (.kpl) is a kind of XML playlist storing developed to speed up loading and managing playlists.
 .pla, Samsung format(?), binary, Winamp handles these
 XSPF, an XML format designed to enable playlist sharing.
 WPL is an XML format used in Microsoft Windows Media Player versions 9–11.

Playlist markup languages